Simple Simon: A Thriller is a 1996 novel written by American author Ryne Douglas Pearson. The novel was adapted into the film Mercury Rising in 1998.

Plot
Arthur “Art” Jefferson has to protect an autistic 16-year-old boy, Simon Lynch, who hacked a government code, from an assassin.

Film adaptation
The novel was adapted to the 1998 film Mercury Rising directed by Harold Becker, and starring Bruce Willis, Alec Baldwin, and Miko Hughes, it was distributed by Universal Pictures.

References

1996 novels
American thriller novels
American mystery novels
Books about autism
American crime novels